The women's 100 metre breaststroke swimming events for the 2016 Summer Paralympics take place at the Rio Olympic Stadium from 8 to 16 September. A total of ten events are contested for ten different classifications.

Competition format
Each event consists of two rounds: heats and final. The top eight swimmers overall in the heats progress to the final. If there are eight or fewer swimmers in an event, no heats are held and all swimmers qualify for the final.

Results

SB4

20:04 11 September 2016:

SB5

17:37 11 September 2016:

SB6

17:50 15 September 2016:

SB7

17:37 10 September 2016:

SB8

17:36 14 September 2016:

SB9

18:12 8 September 2016:

SB11

18:52 13 September 2016:

SB13

18:08 11 September 2016:

SB14

18:13 14 September 2016:

References

Swimming at the 2016 Summer Paralympics